Adam Roberts (born December 28, 1984) is a Canadian Grand Prix motorcycle racer

Career statistics

By season

Races by year

References

External links
 Profile on motogp.com

Canadian motorcycle racers
Living people
250cc World Championship riders
1984 births